is a retired Japanese female mixed martial artist, kickboxer, professional wrestler and judoka. She has participated in several Japanese professional wrestling and mixed martial arts promotions. She is a Japanese national judo champion and a former Smackgirl open weight champion and tournament winner.

Background
Her father introduced her into judo, training her before entering elementary school. Yabushita excelled at judo starting in high school and became a regular participant in national championships.

Judo career
Yabushita graduated from Asahikawa University High School, where she won the judo club competitions in the less than 48 kg division in 1988 and 1989. Scouted by Japan's corporate judo team Miki House, she won the all-Japan individual championships in 1993, in 1994 she placed third in the Fukuoka international women's judo championships in the 52 kg class and in 1995 she placed fifth in the World Masters Munich in the 52 kg class. and also participated in the 52 kg class in the 1995 World Judo Championships celebrated in Chiba, Japan.

Professional wrestling career

On , Yabushita and Sakai became the Trans-world Wrestling Federation
World Women's Tag Team champions. and defended it one time before losing it on  against Crusher Maedomari and Drake Morimatsu. Yabushita left Jd' gym in 2002.

On , Yabushita defeated The Bloody to win the BS Japan Queen of the Ring Title, and with his victory of the AWF title, she unifies both titles that then became the Jd' Double Title.

Mixed martial arts career
When she joined women's wrestling promotion Jd' in 1996, she met Yoko Takahashi, "Japan's First Woman MMA Fighter." At the time, Takahashi, injured with a hernia that made her retire from pro-wrestling and focus on MMA, was working as pro-wrestling referee and also trained in MMA, which was the reason why Yabushita started training in MMA. On , Yabushita made her MMA debut against South Korea Ji Hee Yu, defeating her with an armbar submission at 2:51 of the first round at Central Martial Arts Association event Octagon Challenge, held at the Nagoya Congress Center Century Hall in Nagoya, Aichi, Japan.

Yabushita's first match in the tournament was against American kickboxer Bambi Bertoncello, whom Yabushita defeated with an armbar submission. Despite these disadvantages, Yabushita was able to control the fight with her quickness and takedown skills, earning a unanimous decision victory and a spot in the final. In the final, Dutch fighter Marloes Coenen defeated Yabushita by unanimous decision. With her performance in the tournament, Yabushita and women's MMA became one of the hottest topics in Japanese fight sports.

On , Yabushita got another victory by submitting Japanese kickboxer Naoko Sakamoto with an armbar at 0:23 of round one in Smackgirl Third Season-IV.

On , Yabushita participated in Smackgirl's World ReMix 2004 held on Shizuoka, Shizuoka Prefecture, Japan, in the open weight queen decision tournament, which would crown the first Smackgirl open weight champion. Josh Barnett's student, American fighter Shannon Hooper, was Yabushita's first opponent whom Yabushita defeated at 0:29 of round one with a wristlock. Yabushita next faced American grappler Roxanne Modafferi in the semi-finals, defeating Modafferi by unanimous decision. In a rematch of their 2001 bout, Yamaguchi and Erin Toughill fought in the tournament final. The referee immediately stopped the fight and gave Toughill a yellow card while Yabushita was writhing in pain. The ring doctor didn't allow the bout to continue after checking Yabushita, which resulted in an immediate disqualification for Toughill and this gave the open weight title to Yabushita.

On , Yabushita fought against South Korean kickboxer Hyun Sung Kim as part of the opening round of Smackgirl's first middleweight queen decision tournament in Smackgirl 2005: Cool Fighter's Last Stand. In an unexpected development, as Kim advanced to attack, Yabushita used a judo throw on Kim which slammed Kim's face directly on the mat, knocking her out instantly, while Yabushita tried an arm submission, unaware of Kim's state. The referee rushed to stop the fight and Yabushita won at 0:29 of round one, with Yabushita not knowing what transpired until asking her corner. There was concern over Kim's health, as she had to be carried outside the ring on a stretcher but after being examined at the hospital there were no abnormalities found on Kim.

On , Yabushita returned to Smackgirl for the final part of the middleweight queen decision tournament that took place in the event Smackgirl 2005: Dynamic!! in Shibuya, Tokyo, Japan. In the semi-finals, Yabushita defeated Asako Saioka by armbar, avenging her 2002 loss against Saioka. Yabushita was defeated in a 1-2 decision in the tournament final by American fighter Laura D'Auguste, who became the first Smackgirl middleweight champion.

On , Yabushita and Laura D'Auguste had a rematch in which D'Auguste was defending her Ring of Combat women's welterweight title in Ring of Combat 11 held in Atlantic City, New Jersey, United States. Yabushita's corner was forced to stop the fight after Yabushita got her forearm fractured during the first round.

On , Yabushita defeated Mayumi Aoki by unanimous decision in Smackgirl 2007: The Dance of the Taisho Romance.

Her first bout was against Lithuanian kickboxer Jurgita Leitonaite, whom Yabushita defeated in 17 seconds with an armbar. For the third time, Yabushita clashed with Roxanne Modafferi, with Modafferi gaining a unanimous decision and advancing to the final which she eventually won.

On , Yabushita was defeated by American fighter Lisa Ellis with a unanimous decision in the event Fatal Femmes Fighting Championship 3: War of the Roses.

On , Yabushita defeated Emoto by submission (armbar) at 2:43 mins. of round one after resisting Emoto's initial attack.

For the third time, Yabushita was facing another Josh Barnett's student, this time submission specialist Shayna Baszler, who dominated the fight and submitted Yabushita with a twister, a catch wrestling move rarely seen in MMA.

On , Yabushita made her debut with Valkyrie promotion, defeating Japanese fighter Mutsumi Kasai with a scarf hold armlock submission, handling Kasai her first professional loss, in the event Valkyrie 05.

She was defeated by TKO in the third round.

She was defeated by TKO (doctor stoppage) due to an ankle injury sustained in the first round.

She was defeated by split decision.

On , Yabushita faced Jade Marie Anderson at Jewels 22nd Ring. She was defeated by unanimous decision.

She was defeated by technical submission due to an armbar in the first round.

Submission grappling career

Kickboxing and Shoot boxing career
On , Yabushita debuted in kickboxing, losing against Yuko Okamoto by TKO, after Yabushita had her left shoulder dislocated in All-Japan Kickboxing Federation event Girls standing fight 1st. bout - Girls Shock!.

On , Yabushita was defeated by Kozue "Azuma" Nagashima in a 3-0 decision in the event New Japan Kickboxing Federation: Neppuu Reisan.

On  at Dragon Gym event Charity kickboxing event: No Name Heroes 10, Yabushita was defeated via unanimous decision by Monica, MAD 66 kg champion.

On , Yabushita faced Seo Hee Ham for a second time at Gladiator 14 KOK Samurai Series. Yabushita lost the fight by TKO in the second round.

On , Yabushita faced Hiroko Yamanaka in a shoot boxing match at the 2011 Shoot Boxing Girls S-Cup. She was defeated by TKO (doctor stoppage) due to a knee injury in round three.

Outside sports
Yabushita has a younger sister named  who is also a judoka.

Yabushita along with Yoko Takahashi left Jd' in 2002 and associated with Soft on Demand (SOD), one of the biggest adult film makers in Japan, and founded SOD Women's MMA Dojo and started to train MMA fighters. This situation forced them to collaborate with Fang Gym in order to have a place to train. They negotiated with Exit, a bar / live house in Shinjuku, Tokyo, to become bouncers at the place during the night and to use the live house space for their training and the amateur MMA shows free of charge during the day. When they decided to change the name of their team for a name that represented "girls that keep on fighting", they met with American clothing brand Fight Chix and contacted the company for a possible collaboration which was accepted. Yabushita and Takahashi renamed their team to Team Fight Chix. With their partnership, Yabushita and Takahashi are introducing, marketing and distributing Fight Chix products in the Japanese market.

Yabushita uses Kula Shaker's cover of Hush as her ring entrance theme in pro-wrestling. In MMA, she uses Visa's Fly Away song as her entrance theme.

Mixed martial arts record

|-
| Loss
| align=center| 19-23
| Chan-Mi Jeon
| TKO (punches)
| All Fighting Championship 5
| 
| align=center| 1
| align=center| 3:00
| Incheon, South Korea
| 
|-
| Loss
| align=center| 19-22
| Jade Marie Anderson
| Technical Submission (armbar)
| Gladiator: Dream, Power and Hope
| 
| align=center| 1
| align=center| 2:33
| Sapporo, Hokkaido, Japan
| 
|-
| Loss
| align=center| 19-21
| Jade Marie Anderson
| Decision (unanimous)
| Jewels 22nd Ring
| 
| align=center| 2
| align=center| 5:00
| Ariake, Koto, Tokyo, Japan
| 
|-
| Loss
| align=center| 19-20
| Shizuka Sugiyama
| Decision (split)
| Jewels 20th Ring
| 
| align=center| 2
| align=center| 5:00
| Ariake, Koto, Tokyo, Japan
| 
|-
| Loss
| align=center| 19-19
| Kyoko Kimura
| TKO (doctor stoppage)
| Pancrase: Impressive Tour 11
| 
| align=center| 1
| align=center| 5:00
| Kabukicho, Tokyo, Japan
| 
|-
| Loss
| align=center| 19-18
| Sarah Kaufman
| TKO (punches)
| AFC 5: Judgment Day
| 
| align=center| 3
| align=center| 3:34
| Victoria, British Columbia, Canada
| 
|-
| Loss
| align=center| 19-17
| Rin Nakai
| Decision (unanimous)
| Valkyrie 06
| 
| align=center| 3
| align=center| 3:00
| Ariake, Koto, Tokyo, Japan
| 
|-
| Win
| align=center| 19-16
| Mutsumi Kasai
| Submission (scarf hold armlock)
| Valkyrie 05
| 
| align=center| 2
| align=center| 2:58
| Ariake, Koto, Tokyo, Japan
| 
|-
| Loss
| align=center| 18-16
| Shayna Baszler
| Submission (twister)
| Freestyle Cage Fighting 39
| 
| align=center| 1
| align=center| 4:50
| Shawnee, Oklahoma, United States
| 
|-
| Win
| align=center| 18-15
| Atsuko Emoto
| Submission (armbar)
| Jewels 5th Ring
| 
| align=center| 1
| align=center| 2:43
| Kabukicho, Tokyo, Japan
| 
|-
| Win
| align=center| 17-15
| Emi Fujino
| Decision (unanimous)
| Demolition 080721
| 
| align=center| 3
| align=center| 3:00
| Ariake, Koto, Tokyo, Japan
| 
|-
| Loss
| align=center| 16-15
| Julia Berezikova
| Decision (unanimous)
| FightFORCE: Russia vs. The World
| 
| align=center| 3
| align=center| 5:00
| Saint Petersburg, Russia
| 
|-
| Loss
| align=center| 16-14
| Hitomi Akano
| Submission (heel hook)
| Smackgirl World ReMix Tournament 2008 Opening Round
| 
| align=center| 2
| align=center| 4:16
| Bunkyo, Tokyo, Japan
| 
|-
| Loss
| align=center| 16-13
| Lana Stefanac
| Decision (unanimous)
| Smackgirl 7th anniversary: Starting Over
| 
| align=center| 2
| align=center| 5:00
| Bunkyo, Tokyo, Japan
| 
|-
| Loss
| align=center| 16-12
| Lisa Ellis
| Decision (unanimous)
| Fatal Femmes Fighting Championship 3: War of the Roses
| 
| align=center| 3
| align=center| 3:00
| Compton, Los Angeles County, California, United States
| 
|-
| Win
| align=center| 16-11
| Hiromi Kohata
| Submission (armbar)
| Smackgirl in Summerfest!!
| 
| align=center| 1
| align=center| 0:15
| Shibuya, Tokyo, Japan
| 
|-
| Loss
| align=center| 15-11
| Ginele Marquez
| Decision (unanimous)
| Fatal Femmes Fighting Championship 2: The Crystal Brawl
| 
| align=center| 3
| align=center| 3:00
| Compton, Los Angeles County, California, United States
| 
|-
| Loss
| align=center| 15-10
| Roxanne Modafferi
| Decision (unanimous)
| K-GRACE
| 
| align=center| 2
| align=center| 3:00
| Ariake, Koto, Tokyo, Japan
| 
|-
| Win
| align=center| 15-9
| Jurgita Leitonaite
| Submission (armbar)
| K-GRACE
| 
| align=center| 1
| align=center| 0:17
| Ariake, Koto, Tokyo, Japan
| 
|-
| Win
| align=center| 14-9
| Mayumi Aoki
| Decision (unanimous)
| Smackgirl: The Dance of the Taisho Romance
| 
| align=center| 2
| align=center| 5:00
| Taisho, Osaka, Japan
| 
|-
| Win
| align=center| 13-9
| Mizuho Sato
| Decision (majority)
| Shooto: Battle Mix Tokyo 2
| 
| align=center| 2
| align=center| 5:00
| Taito, Tokyo, Japan
| 
|-
| Loss
| align=center| 12-9
| Laura D'Auguste
| TKO (corner stoppage)
| Ring of Combat 11
| 
| align=center| 1
| align=center| 5:00
| Atlantic City, New Jersey, United States
| 
|-
| Loss
| align=center| 12-8
| Roxanne Modafferi
| Decision (unanimous)
| G-Shooto: G-Shooto 05
| 
| align=center| 2
| align=center| 5:00
| Kabukicho, Tokyo, Japan
| 
|-
| Loss
| align=center| 12-7
| Amanda Buckner
| Submission (guillotine choke)
| Smackgirl 2006: Advent of Goddess
| 
| align=center| 1
| align=center| 3:45
| Bunkyo, Tokyo, Japan
| 
|-
| Loss
| align=center| 12-6
| Laura D'Auguste
| Decision (split)
| Smackgirl 2005: Dynamic!!
| 
| align=center| 3
| align=center| 5:00
| Shibuya, Tokyo, Japan
| 
|-
| Win
| align=center| 12-5
| Asako Saioka
| Submission (armbar)
| Smackgirl 2005: Dynamic!!
| 
| align=center| 1
| align=center| 2:44
| Shibuya, Tokyo, Japan
| 
|-
| Win
| align=center| 11-5
| Yong Joo Lee
| Decision (unanimous)
| WXF: X-Impact World Championships
| 
| align=center| 3
| align=center| 5:00
| Seoul, South Korea
| 
|-
| Win
| align=center| 10-5
| Hyun Sung Kim
| KO (slam)
| Smackgirl: Cool Fighter's Last Stand
| 
| align=center| 1
| align=center| 0:29
| Numazu, Shizuoka, Japan
| 
|-
| Loss
| align=center| 9-5
| Tara LaRosa
| Decision (majority)
| G-Shooto: G-Shooto 02
| 
| align=center| 2
| align=center| 5:00
| Aomi, Koto, Tokyo, Japan
| 
|-
| Win
| align=center| 9-4
| Erin Toughill
| DQ (elbows)
| Smackgirl: World ReMix 2004
| 
| align=center| 1
| align=center| 2:39
| Shizuoka, Shizuoka, Japan
| 
|-
| Win
| align=center| 8-4
| Roxanne Modafferi
| Decision (unanimous)
| Smackgirl: World ReMix 2004
| 
| align=center| 2
| align=center| 5:00
| Shizuoka, Shizuoka, Japan
| 
|-
| Win
| align=center| 7-4
| Shannon Hooper
| Submission (wristlock)
| Smackgirl: World ReMix 2004
| 
| align=center| 1
| align=center| 0:29
| Shizuoka, Shizuoka, Japan
| 
|-
| Win
| align=center| 6-4
| Hitomi Akano
| Decision (unanimous)
| G-Shooto: G-Shooto 01
| 
| align=center| 2
| align=center| 5:00
| Aomi, Koto, Tokyo, Japan
| 
|-
| Win
| align=center| 5-4
| Shioya Yoshimi
| Submission (armbar)
| All Japan Women's Pro-Wrestling: Tag League: The Best
| 
| align=center| 1
| align=center| 4:14
| Setagaya, Tokyo, Japan
| 
|-
| Win
| align=center| 4-4
| Naoko Sakamoto
| Submission (armbar)
| Smackgirl: Third Season 4
| 
| align=center| 1
| align=center| 0:23
| Roppongi, Minato, Tokyo, Japan
| 
|-
| Loss
| align=center| 3-4
| Asako Saioka
| Decision (unanimous)
| Smackgirl: Smack Legend 2002
| 
| align=center| 3
| align=center| 5:00
| Ariake, Tokyo, Japan
| 
|-
| Loss
| align=center| 3-3
| Marloes Coenen
| Submission (rear-naked choke)
| Jd': No Holds Barred
| 
| align=center| 1
| align=center| 2:27
| Bunkyo, Tokyo, Japan
| 
|-
| Loss
| align=center| 3-2
| Erin Toughill
| Technical Submission (armbar)
| ReMix: Golden Gate 2001
| 
| align=center| 2
| align=center| 3:10
| Shibuya, Tokyo, Japan
| 
|-
| Loss
| align=center| 3-1
| Marloes Coenen
| Decision (unanimous)
| ReMix: World Cup 2000
| 
| align=center| 3
| align=center| 5:00
| Chiyoda, Tokyo, Japan
| 
|-
| Win
| align=center| 3-0
| Svetlana Goundarenko
| Decision (unanimous)
| ReMix: World Cup 2000
| 
| align=center| 2
| align=center| 5:00
| Chiyoda, Tokyo, Japan
| 
|-
| Win
| align=center| 2-0
| Bambi Bertoncello
| Submission (armbar)
| ReMix: World Cup 2000
| 
| align=center| 1
| align=center| 2:07
| Chiyoda, Tokyo, Japan
| 
|-
| Win
| align=center| 1-0
| Ji Hee Yu
| Submission (armbar)
| CMA: Octagon Challenge
| 
| align=center| 1
| align=center| 2:51
| Nagoya, Aichi, Japan
|

Submission grappling

Legend:

Kickboxing and Shoot boxing record

Legend:

Championships and accomplishments

Judo
All-Japan individual championships 1993 52 kg winner
Fukuoka international women's judo championships 1994 52 kg third place
World Masters Munich 1995 52 kg fifth place

Professional wrestling
Jd' junior title holder
TWF World Tag Team title holder (partner Sumie Sakai)
TWF World Tag Team title holder (partner Maru)
AWF World Women title holder
AWF & QOR Unified title holder, JD' double title holder
Daily Sports Women's Tag Team Championship (partner Command Bolshoi)
JWP Tag Team Championship (partner Command Bolshoi)
WWWD World Tag Team Championship (partner Chikayo Nagashima)

Mixed martial arts
Smackgirl Open Weight Champion
Smackgirl Open Weight Queen tournament winner
Smackgirl First Middleweight Queen tournament runner-up
ReMix Open Weight World Tournament 2000 runner-up

See also
List of female mixed martial artists
List of female kickboxers

References

External links

 
Profile at Fightergirls.com
Profile at Good Luck Company 
Official blog 

Japanese female mixed martial artists
Japanese female kickboxers
Japanese female professional wrestlers
Japanese female judoka
Mixed martial artists utilizing judo
Mixed martial artists utilizing Muay Thai
Mixed martial artists utilizing shootboxing
Mixed martial artists utilizing shoot wrestling
Japanese Muay Thai practitioners
Female Muay Thai practitioners
1972 births
Living people
People from Asahikawa
Sportspeople from Hokkaido